Murray Golden (October 24, 1912 – August 5, 1991) was an American television director. He directed for television programs including The Fugitive, Bonanza, The Rifleman, Mannix, Trapper John, M.D., Rawhide, The Time Tunnel, Burke's Law, Get Smart and Star Trek: The Original Series. Golden died in August 1991 of complications from a stroke in Encino, California, at the age of 78.

Filmography

Television

References

External links

1912 births
1991 deaths
American television directors
Artists from New York City